Yevgeni Aleksandrovich Martyanov (born 27 April 1959) is a Russian professional football coach and a former player. Since late 1990s, he works as a youth teams coach with FC Shinnik Yaroslavl.

Club career
He made his professional debut in the Soviet First League in 1977 for FC Shinnik Yaroslavl.

References

1959 births
Footballers from Yaroslavl
Living people
Soviet footballers
Russian footballers
Association football midfielders
Russian Premier League players
FC Lada-Tolyatti players
FC Shinnik Yaroslavl players
FC Okean Nakhodka players
Russian football managers
FC Iskra Smolensk players
FC Spartak-UGP Anapa players